This article includes a table of countries and subnational areas by annual population growth rate.


Methodology
The table below shows annual population growth rate history and projections for various areas, countries, regions and sub-regions from various sources for various time periods.

The right-most column shows a projection for the time period shown using the medium fertility variant. Preceding columns show actual history. The number shown is the average annual growth rate for the period.

Population is based on the de facto definition of population, which counts all residents regardless of legal status or citizenship—except for refugees not permanently settled in the country of asylum, who are generally considered part of the population of the country of origin. This means that population growth in this table includes net changes from immigration and emigration. For a table of natural increase, see List of countries by natural increase.

Table 

* indicates "Demographics of COUNTRY or TERRITORY" links.

More maps

See also 

List of countries by natural increase

References

Lists of countries by population
Lists of countries by population-related issue